An outwash plain, also called a sandur (plural: sandurs), sandr or sandar, is a plain formed of glaciofluvial deposits due to meltwater outwash at the terminus of a glacier. As it flows, the glacier grinds the underlying rock surface and carries the debris along. The meltwater at the snout of the glacier deposits its load of sediment over the outwash plain, with larger boulders being deposited near the terminal moraine, and smaller particles travelling further before being deposited. Sandurs are common in Iceland where geothermal activity accelerates the melting of ice flows and the deposition of sediment by meltwater.

Formation 
Sandurs are found in glaciated areas, such as Svalbard, Kerguelen Islands, and Iceland.  Glaciers and icecaps contain large amounts of silt and sediment, picked up as they erode the underlying rocks when they move slowly downhill, and at the snout of the glacier, meltwater can carry this sediment away from the glacier and deposit it on a broad plain. The material in the outwash plain is often size-sorted by the water runoff of the melting glacier with the finest materials, like silt, being the most distantly re-deposited, whereas larger boulders are the closest to the original terminus of the glacier.

An outwash plain might contain surficial braided stream complexes that rework the original deposits.  They may also contain kettle lakes, locations where blocks of ice have melted, leaving a depression that fills with water. The flow pattern of glacial rivers across sandar is typically diffuse and unchannelized, but in situations where the glacial snout has retreated from the terminal moraine, the flow is more channelized.

Sandurs are most common in Iceland, where geothermal activity beneath ice caps speeds up the deposition of sediment by meltwater.  As well as regular geothermal activity, volcanic activity gives rise to large glacial bursts several times a century, which carry down large volumes of sediment.

The Gaspé Peninsula that makes up the essential part of southern Quebec (Lower St-Lawrence and Gaspé areas) also contains several examples of paleo-sandar, dating from the Pleistocene ice melt.

The prototype sandur 

Volcanic eruptions under the icecap have given rise to many large glacial bursts ( in Icelandic), most recently in 1996, when the Ring Road was washed away (minor floods have also occurred since then). This road, which encircles Iceland and was completed in 1974, has since been repaired. Net deposition of sediment was estimated to be .

The erosional patterns of  can be seen by looking at the centimetre-scale elevation differences measured with repeat-pass laser altimetry (LIDAR) flown in 1996 (pre-flood), 1997, and 2001. Of the overall deposition during the 1996 jökulhlaup, nearly half of the net gain had been eroded 4 years after the flood. These two rivers on the sandur display drastically different erosional patterns. The Gígjukvísl river is where some of the highest level of sediment deposit occurred and also where the largest erosion happened afterward. This indicates that these massive jökulhlaup deposits may have a large geomorphic impact in the short term, but the net change on the surface relief could be minimal after a couple of years to a decade.

However, in order to have sustained active accretion across the entire sandur there needs to be a diffuse, multipoint distribution system.

Fossil sandar 
Fossil sandar (i.e. no longer active) are found in areas which were formerly glaciated. An example would be the Usk Valley of South Wales where, towards the end of the last ice age, the receding Usk valley glacier left behind a series of recessional moraines and sandar deposits down-valley of them. Many of the sandar surfaces are still visible, albeit degraded over succeeding millennia. Extensive sandar are also recorded in the eastern part of the Cheshire Plain and beneath Morecambe Bay, both in northwest England. 'Valley sandur' deposits are recorded from various localities in that same region.

See also

References 

 Church, Michael A. (1972), Baffin Island sandurs: a study of arctic fluvial processes.
 Garvin J.B. (2001), Topographic Dynamics of Kerguelen Island: A Preliminary SRTM Analysis, American Geophysical Union, Fall Meeting 2001
 Gomez B., Russell A.J., Finnegan D.C., Smith L.C., Knudsen O. (2001), Sediment Distribution on Skeidararsandur, Southeast Iceland, American Geophysical Union, Fall Meeting 2001
 Hardardottir J., Snorrason A., Zophoniasson S., Jonsson P., Sigurdsson O., Elefsen S.O. (2003), Glacial Outburst Floods (Jökulhlaups) in Iceland, EGS - AGU - EUG Joint Assembly, Abstracts from the meeting held in Nice, France, 6–11 April 2003
 Magilligan F.J., Gomez B., Mertes L.A.K., Smith, L.C. Smith N.D., Finnegan D., Garvin J.B., Geomorphic effectiveness, sandur development, and the pattern of landscape response during jökulhlaups: , southeastern Iceland, Geomorphology 44 (2002) 95–113
 Hétu, B., La déglaciation de la région de Rimouski, Bas-Saint-Laurent (Québec): Indices d'une récurrence glaciaire dans la mer de Goldthwait entre 12400 et 12000 BP, Géographie physique et Quaternaire, 1998, vol. 52, n.3, p. 325-347
 Smith L.C., Sheng Y., Magilligan F.J., Smith N.D., Gomez B., Mertes L., Krabill W.B., Garven J.B., Geomorphic impact and rapid subsequent recovery from the 1996  jökulhlaup, Iceland, measured with multi-year airborne lidar. Geomorphology vol. 75 Is. 1-2 (2006) 65-75

External links 
 NASA page about the Skeiðarársandur
 A study of sandur formation in western Greenland

 
Glacial landforms
Glaciology